Hall High School may refer to:

Hall High School (Arkansas) — Little Rock, Arkansas
Hall High School (Connecticut) — West Hartford, Connecticut
Hall High School (Illinois) — Spring Valley, Illinois
East Hall High School — Gainesville, Georgia
North Hall High School — Gainesville, Georgia
West Hall High School — Oakwood, Georgia
White Hall High School — White Hall, Arkansas
Calvert Hall College High School — Towson, Maryland
Cretin-Derham Hall High School — St. Paul, Minnesota
Lyman Hall High School — Wallingford, Connecticut
Nerinx Hall High School — St. Louis, Missouri
Perry Hall High School — Baltimore, Maryland
Seton Hall Preparatory School — West Orange, New Jersey
Holland Hall — Tulsa, Oklahoma